The Blue Sky Tower is an ultra-modern 25 story, 105 meters (344 ft) tall steel and glass skyscraper that stands just to the south of Sükhbaatar Square in Mongolia's capital Ulaanbaatar. It houses a 200-room hotel, luxury apartments, restaurants as well as office and conference spaces. 

The skyscraper consists of a curtain wall made of blue tinted glass in reference to Mongolia's moniker as "the land of the eternal blue sky", but also as a signal to foreign corporations of Mongolia's transparency and openness to business.  Blue Sky Tower serves as a landmark that dominates the central Ulaanbaatar skyline thanks to its location and distinctive shape. Designed in the style of a sail or fin, it appears to be modeled after the Burj Al Arab in Dubai.  Mongolians often refer to it derisively as "the meat cleaver" or "the sail boat" and the purpose of a sea themed edifice in the capital of a landlocked country is unclear.  

Construction on the skyscraper, designed in cooperation with a South Korean company, began in 2007 but was temporarily suspended during the political tensions that followed Mongolia's legislative election in June 2008. Upon its completion in 2009, Blue Sky Tower was the tallest building in Ulaanbaatar but has since been overtaken by other buildings erected as part of the city's construction boom.

References

External links
Official site

Buildings and structures in Ulaanbaatar